The 1963 SANFL Grand Final was an Australian rules football competition.   beat  80 to 47.

References 

SANFL Grand Finals
SANFL Grand Final, 1963